Gyula Török (24 January 1938 – 12 January 2014) was an amateur Hungarian boxer. Competing in the flyweight division he won the national title in 1957–58, a silver medal at the 1959 European Championships, and a gold medal at the 1960 Olympics. After that he moved to bantamweight and won three more national titles in 1961, 1962 and 1964. He lost to Primo Zamparini in a quarter-final of the 1961 European Championships, and to Oleg Grigoryev in his first bout at the 1964 Olympics. Török retired from competitions in 1966 and for 40 years worked at the Kispest Granite Factory. In parallel he coached boxers at Építők SC in 1976–78 and at Csepel SC in 1978–81. In the 1990 he also worked for the national boxing team and the Hungarian Boxing Federation. Török was Jewish.

1964 Olympic results
Below is the record of Gyula Török, a Hungarian bantamweight boxer who competed at the 1964 Tokyo Olympics:

 Round of 32: lost to Oleg Grigoryev (Soviet Union) referee stopped contest

References

1938 births
2014 deaths
Flyweight boxers
Boxers at the 1960 Summer Olympics
Boxers at the 1964 Summer Olympics
Olympic boxers of Hungary
Olympic gold medalists for Hungary
Olympic medalists in boxing
Medalists at the 1960 Summer Olympics
Hungarian male boxers
Jewish Hungarian sportspeople
Jewish boxers
Boxers from Budapest